Kuskov is a Russian masculine surname, its feminine counterpart is Kuskova. It may refer to
Dmitry Kuskov (1876–1956), Russian sports shooter
Ivan Kuskov (1765–1823), Russian explorer
Sergey Kuskov (1957–2008), Russian curator
Yekaterina Kuskova (1869–1958), Russian economist, journalist and politician

Russian-language surnames